Scottish Rite Cathedral is a historic Scottish Rite Masonic building at 2128 Church Street in Galveston, Texas.

It was built in 1928 and added to the National Register of Historic Places in 1984.

See also

National Register of Historic Places listings in Galveston County, Texas

References

Masonic buildings in Texas
Clubhouses on the National Register of Historic Places in Texas
National Register of Historic Places in Galveston County, Texas
Masonic buildings completed in 1928
Buildings and structures in Galveston, Texas
Alfred C. Finn buildings